1644 Rafita, provisional designation , is a stony asteroid from the middle region of the asteroid belt, approximately 15 kilometers in diameter. It is the namesake of the Rafita family, a family of stony asteroids in the intermediate main-belt. However, Rafita is a suspected interloper in its own family. It was discovered on 16 December 1935, by Spanish astronomer Rafael Carrasco Garrorena at the Royal Observatorio Astronómico de Madrid in Spain, and named in memory of the discoverer's son.

Orbit and classification 

Rafita asteroid orbits the Sun in the central main-belt at a distance of 2.2–2.9 AU once every 4 years and 1 month (1,486 days). Its orbit has an eccentricity of 0.15 and an inclination of 7° with respect to the ecliptic.

Lightcurves 

Rafitas first rotational lightcurve was obtained by American astronomer Alan Harris of JPL in January 1981. It gave a rotation period of 5.100 hours with a brightness variation of 0.31 magnitude. Photometric observations by French amateur astronomer Laurent Bernasconi in December 2004, gave a period of 6.800 hours and an amplitude of 0.13 magnitude.

Diameter and albedo 

According to the surveys carried out by the Japanese Akari satellite and NASA's Wide-field Infrared Survey Explorer with its subsequent NEOWISE mission, Rafita measures between 13.96 and 17.69 kilometers in diameter, and its surface has an albedo between 0.106 and 0.164. The Collaborative Asteroid Lightcurve Link agrees with Petr Pravec's revised WISE-results, that is an albedo of 0.1329 and a diameter of 15.482 kilometers, based on an absolute magnitude of 11.86.

Naming 

This minor planet was named by the discoverer in honor of his late son, Rafael Carrasco. The official  was published by the Minor Planet Center on 30 January 1964.

References

External links 
 Asteroid Lightcurve Database (LCDB), query form (info )
 Dictionary of Minor Planet Names, Google books
 Asteroids and comets rotation curves, CdR – Observatoire de Genève, Raoul Behrend
 Discovery Circumstances: Numbered Minor Planets (1)-(5000) – Minor Planet Center
 
 

 

001644
Discoveries by Rafael Carrasco Garrorena
Named minor planets
001644
19351216